Thomas Gankama-Quiwonkpa (27 July 1955 – 17 November 1985), a Dan from Nimba County, was a Commanding General of the Armed Forces of Liberia (AFL) and founder of the National Patriotic Front of Liberia (NPFL).

Biography
Born in the town of Zualay in 1955, Quiwonkpa was the son of subsistence farmers.  At the age of sixteen, he joined the AFL. After finishing high school in 1978 through a programme at the Barclay Training Center, he received an assignment to the AFL's records department.

Part of Samuel Doe's coup (1980)
He came to prominence on 12 April 1980, when he assisted Samuel Doe in a military coup that overthrew the Americo-Liberian government of William R. Tolbert, Jr. About a month later, the revolutionaries arrested AFL commander-in-chief Edwin Lloyd and other military leaders on charges of planning a counter-coup. By mid-May, Quiwonkpa was proclaimed a major general and made the new AFL commander.

Two months later he was using the title of brigadier general.  Before long, he fell out with Doe; in 1983, Quiwonkpa was demoted and subsequently charged with an attempt to overthrow the Doe administration, forcing him to flee the country.

Coup attempt against Doe (1985) 
On 12 November 1985, one month after elections were held, Quiwonkpa, supported by about two dozen heavily armed men, covertly entered Liberia through Sierra Leone, and launched a coup against Doe. However, Quiwonkpa's unorthodox methods and lack of support from the United States resulted in a disastrous failure.

Quiwonkpa was captured and on November 15 was killed and mutilated by Krahn soldiers loyal to Doe. His killers then dismembered his body and reportedly ate parts of it. His body was publicly exhibited on the grounds of the Executive Mansion in Monrovia soon after his death.

Joe Wylie, later Deputy Minister of Defense in the NTGL, was among the group who launched the coup.

Post-coup attempt reprisals 
In a campaign of retribution against the coup plotters and their supporters, Doe's government launched a bloody purge against the Gio and Mano ethnic groups in Quiwonkpa's Nimba County, raising alarm about a possible genocide. Doe's slaughter of an estimated 3,000 people provoked ethnic rivalries that later fuelled the First Liberian Civil War.

References

External links 
 Liberia - Election and Coup Attempt - 1985

1955 births
1985 deaths
Liberian murder victims
People murdered in Liberia
People from Nimba County
Brigadier generals
Executed military leaders
People's Redemption Council
Dan people
People executed by Liberia by firing squad